In molecular spectroscopy, the Birge–Sponer method or Birge–Sponer plot is a way to calculate the dissociation energy of a molecule. By observing transitions between as many vibrational energy levels as possible, for example through electronic or infrared spectroscopy, the difference between the energy levels,  can be calculated. This can be written:

where  is the dissociation energy. If a Morse potential is assumed, plotting  against  should give a straight line, from which it is easy to extract  from the intercept with the x-axis. Thus the extrapolation can be inaccurate and only an upper limit for the value of the dissociation energy can be obtained.

This method takes its name from Raymond Thayer Birge and Hertha Sponer, the two physical chemists that developed it.
A detailed example may be found here.

References 

Spectroscopy